A special election was held in  on July 11, 1826 to fill a vacancy caused by the death of Christopher Rankin (J) on March 14, 1826

Election results

Haile took his seat December 4, 1826

See also
List of special elections to the United States House of Representatives

References

Mississippi 1826 at-large
Mississippi 1826 at-large
1826 at-large
Mississippi at-large
United States House of Representatives at-large
United States House of Representatives 1826 At-large
July 1826 events